Panovo is a rural locality (a village) in Sidorovskoye Rural Settlement, Gryazovetsky District, Vologda Oblast, Russia. The population was 35 as of 2002.

Geography 
Panovo is located 38 km southeast of Gryazovets (the district's administrative centre) by road. Anokhino is the nearest rural locality.

References 

Rural localities in Gryazovetsky District